S. K. Dunstall is the pen name used by Australian sisters Sherylyn and Karen Dunstall.   They write science fiction and space opera.  Karen mostly manages the website and blog while Sherylyn the social media.

Bibliography

Linesman series 
 Linesman (2015,)
 Alliance (2016,)
 Confluence (2016,)

Stars Uncharted series 
 Stars Uncharted (2018,)
 Stars Beyond (2020,)

References

External links

Living people
Year of birth missing (living people)
Australian science fiction writers
21st-century pseudonymous writers
Pseudonymous women writers
Writing duos
Collective pseudonyms